Joseph Stanley Crowther, known as Stan Crowther, (30 May 1925 – 10 March 2013) was British Labour Member of Parliament for Rotherham from a 1976 by-election until his retirement in 1992.  His successor was Jimmy Boyce.

References

Other sources
The Times Guide to the House of Commons, Times Newspapers Ltd, 1987

External links

1925 births
2013 deaths
Labour Party (UK) MPs for English constituencies
UK MPs 1974–1979
UK MPs 1979–1983
UK MPs 1983–1987
UK MPs 1987–1992